Scantropolis is the fifth full-length album by the German speed metal band Scanner. It was released in 2002 by Massacre Records.

Track listing 
"Till the Ferryman Dies" – 5:11
"Hallowed Be My Name" – 5:20
"Flight of the Eagle" – 4:07
"Turn of the Tide" – 6:07
"Always Alien" – 4:45
"Engel Brechts" – 3:43
"Sister Mary" – 5:49
"The Gambler" – 4:30
"R.I.P. (Rest in Pain)" – 3:16
"Till the Ferryman Dies" (live in Stockholm) – 5:51

Credits 
Lisa Croft – vocals
Axel Julius – guitars
Thilo Zaun – guitars
Johannes Brunn – keyboards
Marc Simon – bass
Jan Zimmer – drums

2002 albums
Scanner (band) albums
Massacre Records albums